Blessed by Fire is a 2005 Argentine war drama film co-written and directed by Tristán Bauer. The film features Gastón Pauls, Pablo Ribba and Juan Leyrado. The story centers on the Falklands War and it is based on the homonymous book written by Edgardo Esteban, a veteran of the conflict.

Plot summary
The story centers on two young men who are sent to fight the 1982 war in the Malvinas and who return home bearing the brutal scars of war. Twenty years after the war's end, journalist Esteban Leguizamón is informed that Alberto Vargas, one of the men he served with, has attempted suicide after suffering from years of depression brought on by his experiences in the war. Esteban visits the comatose Vargas at the hospital, and in a series of extended flashbacks, revisits the scene of Argentina's "unwinnable war."

The film depicts Esteban and fellow soldiers Vargas and Juan, who are living in foxholes on the remote, windswept Falklands, battling hunger, boredom, abuse, and the deprivations of war as they await the arrival of British forces. A series of harrowing battle scenes with British forces ensues, and the Argentines realise the futility and violence of their mission. They are cannon fodder, pawns in a futile political game.

Back in the present, Esteban returns to the Falklands to come to terms with himself and the past. The emotional final scenes were shot on location in the Falklands, for the first time in Argentine film. As Esteban looks over the still off-limits battlefields filled with mines, live ammunition, and rusting military equipment, the futility of war is abundantly clear.

Cast
 Gastón Pauls as Esteban Leguizamón
 Pablo Ribba as Alberto Vargas
 César Albarracín as Juan Chamorro
 Victor Hugo Carrizo as Pizarro
 Virginia Innocenti as Maria Vargas
 Juan Leyrado
 Arturo Bonín

Release 
The film was shown on the Australian TV channel SBS on March 17, 2009.

Awards
Silver Condor: Graciela Fraguglia, Alejandro Brodersohn, Tristán Bauer, Edgardo Esteban, Miguel Bonasso, Gustavo Romero Borri, Virginia Innocenti.

References

External links
 
 
 Iluminados por el fuego at the cinenacional.com 

2000s war drama films
2005 films
Anti-war films
Argentine war drama films
Falklands War films
Films about journalists
Films about suicide
Films based on non-fiction books
Films set in Argentina
Films about hunters
Nonlinear narrative films
Films about post-traumatic stress disorder
Spanish war drama films
2000s Spanish-language films
2000s political drama films
2000s buddy films
2005 drama films
2000s Spanish films
2000s Argentine films